A state funeral is a public funeral ceremony, observing the strict rules of protocol, held to honour people of national significance. State funerals usually include much pomp and ceremony as well as religious overtones and distinctive elements of military tradition. Generally, state funerals are held in order to involve the general public in a national day of mourning after the family of the deceased gives consent. A state funeral will often generate mass publicity from both national and global media outlets.

Protocols

Italy 
In Italy state funerals are granted by law to the Presidents of the constitutional entities, such as the Presidency, the Parliament, the Government and the Constitutional Court, even after their terms have expired, and to Ministers who died during their term in office. State Funerals can also be granted, by decree of the Council of Ministers, to people who gave particular services to the country; to citizens that brought honor to the nation; or to citizens who died in the line of duty, or were victims of either terrorism, or organized crime.

The official protocol provides for

 the coffin surrounded by six members in high uniform of either the Carabinieri or the same Armed Force the departed belonged to;
 an honor guard to the coffin at the entrance and the exit of the place in which the ceremony is held;
 the presence of one representative of the Government;
 an official commemorative oration;
 other honors that can be arranged by the Prime Minister.

Public mourning, either national or local, is declared following the dispositions of the Prime Minister's decrees. The flags are flown at half-mast outside of public buildings, while inside they display two black ribbons, with the exceptions provided for military flags, when required by military protocol.

If the departed held a public office, the body can lie in state in the building of the office's institution. In other cases it is followed the will of the family, the traditions of the office or the local customs.

Outside of the cases provided for by the protocol, for example during natural events that deeply impact the community, solemn funerals can be arranged and the six people who carry the coffins are members of the Civil Protection.

See also 
 List of people who have received a state funeral
 Funeral train
 Limbers and caissons
 Lincoln Catafalque
 Lying in repose
 Lying in state
 Military funeral
 Missing man formation
 Riderless horse
 State funerals in Canada
 State funerals in the United States
 Vigil of the Princes

References

Further reading
 
 

 The traditions of a British state funeral
 Memorializing U.S. Presidents
 Funeral Section of the RCMP Ceremonial and Protocol Guide 
 "STATE, OFFICIAL, AND SPECIAL MILITARY FUNERALS" by the U.S. Army
 The Last Salute  (CMH Pub 90–1) published by the United States Army Center of Military History
 NSW Policy on State Funerals 
 Commentary on state funeral offer for Australian Kerry Packer
  Royal Funeral of King Tafa'ahau Tupou IV - Royal Palace Office

Death customs
 
State ritual and ceremonies